Pyanchi II was viceroy of Toungoo (Taungoo) from 1376 to 1379/80. He came to power three months after his father Pyanchi I was assassinated near Prome (Pyay) by the pro-Ava forces in 1375. In the ensuing power struggle at Toungoo, in which the Hanthawaddy army led by Ma Sein had seized the city of Toungoo, he and brother-in-law Sokkate managed to oust Ma Sein. The younger Pyanchi became viceroy but the young viceroy did not govern at all. He is said to have spent much of his time as a playboy. He was assassinated in 1379/80 by Sokkate, who seized the office.

References

Bibliography
 
 
 

Ava dynasty